Lipovec pri Škofji Vasi is a small settlement in the City Municipality of Celje in eastern Slovenia. It lies just east of Ljubečna on the eastern outskirts of Celje. The area is part of the traditional region of Styria. It is now included with the rest of the municipality in the Savinja Statistical Region.

Name
The name of the settlement was changed from Lipovec to Lipovec pri Škofji vasi in 1955.

References

External links
Lipovec pri Škofji Vasi on Geopedia

Populated places in the City Municipality of Celje